Miina Härma (born Miina Hermann; 9 February 1864 – 16 November 1941) was an Estonian composer. She was the second Estonian musician with higher education.

Her greatest contribution is perhaps the fact that she took organ music to the countryside, as virtually no skilled organists gave concerts outside of towns.

During her 60-year creative career, she wrote more than 200 choral songs, 10 cavatinas, a canto, "Kalev and Linda" and much more. She composed mainly vocal music.

Biography 
Härma was born Miina Hermann in 1864 in Kõrveküla, Livonia, Russian Empire to a local teacher and his wife. There were seven children in the family. Both of her parents were musically educated.

Härma began to learn music on her own with a small organ her father bought her. When she was 15, Härma began studying with K. A. Hermann, who gave her lessons in both musical composition and piano. In 1883, Härma entered the Saint Petersburg Conservatory as its only organ student that year. She graduated in 1890, but continued to live in Saint Petersburg because it was very hard to find work in the Baltic governorates. In 1894, the fifth Estonian Song Festival took place, which led to the formation of Härma's own choir.

In 1903, as financial problems overwhelmed her, Härma moved to Kronstadt, Governorate of Saint Petersburg. She had to leave the city in 1915 because of the beginning of the First World War, as no civilians were allowed to stay there.

Despite the fact that music had rapidly developed in Tartu, it was still hard to find a job as a music teacher, since there were almost no students due to the war. In 1917, Härma became a music teacher in a school that is now the Miina Härma Gymnasium.

Härma died on November 16, 1941, in Tartu. She is buried in the Raadi Cemetery.

References

1864 births
1941 deaths
People from Tartu Parish
People from Kreis Dorpat
Estonian organists
Estonian choral conductors
19th-century Estonian composers
20th-century Estonian composers
19th-century organists
20th-century organists
Women organists
Women conductors (music)
19th-century conductors (music)
20th-century conductors (music)
20th-century women composers
19th-century women composers
Saint Petersburg Conservatory alumni
Recipients of the Military Order of the Cross of the Eagle
Burials at Raadi cemetery